The 1903 News of the World Match Play was the first News of the World Match Play tournament. It was played from Tuesday 13 to Thursday 15 October at Sunningdale Golf Club. 32 players competed in a straight knock-out competition, with each match contested over 18 holes, except for the final which was over 36 holes. The winner received £100 out of a total prize fund of £200. James Braid defeated Ted Ray 4 & 3 in the final to win the tournament.

Qualification
Entry was restricted to members of the Professional Golfers' Association (PGA). Qualification was by a series of 36-hole stroke-play competitions; one for each of the five PGA sections. The number of qualifiers from each section was based on the membership of that section. The Southern section had 16 qualifiers, the Midland and Northern sections had 5 each, the Scottish section 4 and the Irish section 2. In the event of a tie for places there was a playoff.

The Northern section held their qualification at Huddersfield on 22 September with Ted Ray winning with a score of 148. The Scottish section qualification was the following day at Earlsferry with Robert Thomson winning with a score of 153. Arnaud Massy failed to qualify, The Irish section played on 24 September at Lahinch with George Coburn winning with a score of 157. The Southern section played on 29 September at Acton with J.H. Taylor winning with a score of 140. There was a tie for the final two places and there was a 36-hole play-off the following day. The Midland section played on 7 October at Hollinwell with Tom Williamson winning with a score of 151. Harry Vardon was ill and did not enter.

The qualifiers were:

Northern section: Sandy Herd, Ted Ray, Tom Simpson, Alfred Toogood, Walter Toogood
Scottish section: Willie Fernie, James Forrester, Andrew Scott, Robert Thomson
Irish section: George Coburn, Willie MacNamara
Southern section: James Braid, George Carter, Harry Cawsey, Arthur Gray, James Hepburn, David Herd, Rowland Jones, John Milne, Arthur Mitchell, Jack Ross, Jack Rowe, Ralph Smith, J.H. Taylor, Tom Vardon, Jack White, Philip Wynne
Midland section: John Clucas, William Jeffries, James Sherlock, Billy Whiting, Tom Williamson

Format
The matches were over 18 holes except for the final which was over 36 holes. Extra holes were played in the event of a tied match. Two rounds were played on the first day, two more on the second day with the final on the third day.

Results
Source:

Prize money
The winner received £100 and a gold medal, the runner-up £30 and a silver medal, the losing semi-finalists £15 and a bronze medal, while the third round losers received £10, making a total prize fund of £200.

References

Golf tournaments in England
News of the World Match Play
News of the World Match Play
News of the World Match Play